Margaret Mary Morrow (born 1950) is a former United States district judge of the United States District Court for the Central District of California.

Early life and education

Born in Columbus, Nebraska, Morrow received an Artium Baccalaureus degree cum laude from Bryn Mawr College in 1971. She received a Juris Doctor cum laude from Harvard Law School in 1974.

Legal career

Morrow practiced law in Los Angeles, California from 1974 to 1998. She was counsel of record in several precedent-setting cases involving employment law, bad faith, insurance coverage and arbitration. In these years representing clients in civil law and criminal law, she represented a wide range of corporate and business involvements during both trial and appellate matters. From 1974 to 1987, she practiced with Kadison, Pfaelzer, Woodard, Quinn & Rossi. In 1987, she and others formed the law firm of Quinn, Kully and Morrow, that ultimately merged with the international law firm offices of Arnold & Porter in 1996. While an attorney in the Los Angeles office of Arnold & Porter, she specialized in Appellate Court litigation. In 1988 she served as president of the Los Angeles County Bar Association. She was elected President of the State Bar of California, then served as its first woman President from 1993 to 1994. In  January 2016, Morrow joined the Los Angeles-based public interest law firm, Public Counsel, as its President and CEO.

Federal judicial career

Morrow was nominated to the United States District Court for the Central District of California by President Bill Clinton on January 7, 1997, to a seat vacated by Richard Arthur Gadbois Jr. She was confirmed by the United States Senate on February 11, 1998, and received her commission on February 24, 1998. She assumed senior status on October 29, 2015. She retired from active service on January 6, 2016.

Significant decisions

 Dr. Sam Chachoua vs. Cedars-Sinai Medical Center
 Vidal Sassoon vs. Procter & Gamble, Co.
 Martin D Fern vs. Matthew Bender & Company, Inc.
 Valueclick Inc vs. Revenue Science, Inc.
 United States vs. Reed Slatkin-Daniel W. Jacobs, et al.
 Marilyn Monroe LLC (MMLLC) and CMG Worldwide Inc. (CMG) vs. Milton H. Greene and Tom Kelley Studios

Achievements

Morrow has served on the boards of numerous professional associations, including the Association of Business Trial Lawyers and the Constitutional Rights Foundation. She is a past officer of the American Bar Association’s House of Delegates and Standing Committee on Legal Aid and Indigent Defendants; and has also served as a member of the Board of Directors of Public Counsel, a member of the Board of Councilors of the University of Southern California Law Center, a member of the advisory board of the Hariett Buhai Center for Family Law, and a member of the board of directors of the Inner City Law Center. She was a member of the Commission to Draft an Ethics Code for Los Angeles City Government and the Public Commission on Los Angeles County Government from 1989 to 1990.

She has received numerous awards, including the Bernard E. Witkin Amicus Curiae Award from the Judicial Council of California; the Shattuck-Price Award from the Los Angeles County Bar Association; the Ernestine Stahlhut Award from the Women Lawyers’ Association of Los Angeles, and the Maynard Toll Award from the Legal Aid Foundation of Los Angeles.

Currently she is a member of the Bryn Mawr College Board of Trustees.

References

External links

  President of Los Angeles County Bar Association
Los Angeles Times editorial

1950 births
Living people
Bryn Mawr College alumni
Harvard Law School alumni
Judges of the United States District Court for the Central District of California
People from Columbus, Nebraska
United States district court judges appointed by Bill Clinton
Arnold & Porter people
20th-century American judges
20th-century American women judges
21st-century American women judges
21st-century American judges